Wüthrich is a Swiss surname that may refer to

 Gabriel Wüthrich, (born 1981), Swiss football player
 Gregory Wüthrich, (born 1994), Swiss football player
 Hans Wuthrich, football match official
 Hans Wuthrich (icemaker), curling ice technician
 Karl Wüthrich, Swiss footballer 
 Kurt Wüthrich, (born 1938), Swiss chemist and Nobel Chemistry laureate
 Rolf Wüthrich, (1938–2004), Swiss football player
 Sébastien Wüthrich, (born 1990), Swiss football player
 Ryn Weaver, (born 1992 as Erin Michelle Wüthrich), American singer-songwriter

Swiss-German surnames